Aliza Akshara Hussein (born 23 July 2000) is a Fijian footballer who plays as a midfielder for Ba FC and the Fiji women's national team.

Hussein is from Yalalevu.  She started playing football at the age of five. She was recruited to Ba FC in 2014.

She was part of the team for the 2017 Pacific Mini Games.

In 2018 she was selected to the Fiji women's national football team for the 2018 OFC women's nations cup.

References

2000 births
Living people
Women's association football midfielders
Fijian women's footballers
Fiji women's international footballers
Fijian people of Indian descent